Malebennur is a town in the Davanagere district of the state of Karnataka, India. It is known for Rice Mills, good quality rice been produced here and exports to other states too. Commercial township for several Villages around it. Malebennuru is also the entrance of Malenadu.

Cities and towns in Davanagere district